Danielle Monique Etienne (born January 16, 2001) is an American-born Haitian footballer who plays as a midfielder for American college Fordham Rams and the Haiti women's national team.

International career
Etienne represented the Haitian National Team at various levels. Etienne competed at the 2018 CONCACAF Women's U-17 Championship in Nicaragua,  the 2018 CONCACAF Women's U-20 Championship in Trinidad and Tobago, the 2018 FIFA U-20 Women's World Cup in France, the 2020 CONCACAF Women's Olympic Qualifying Championship in the United States and the 2020 CONCACAF Women's U-20 Championship in the Dominican Republic. She made a senior appearance debut on October 3, 2019 vs. Suriname.

Personal life
Etienne is the daughter of former Haitian International and Long Island Roughriders forward Derrick Etienne and the younger sister of Darice Etienne and Haitian International winger Derrick Etienne Jr.. Danielle Etienne attended Paramus Catholic High School before joining Fordham University.

References 

1997 births
Living people
Citizens of Haiti through descent
Haitian women's footballers
Women's association football midfielders
Haiti women's international footballers
American women's soccer players
Soccer players from New Jersey
Sportspeople from Paterson, New Jersey
African-American women's soccer players
American sportspeople of Haitian descent
Fordham Rams women's soccer players
Paramus Catholic High School alumni
21st-century African-American sportspeople
21st-century African-American women